John or Jack Nicholls may refer to:
John Nicholls (MP) (c. 1745–1832), British Member of Parliament (MP) for Bletchingley 1783–87 and for Tregony 1796–1802
John C. Nicholls (1834–1893), United States Representative from Georgia
Jack Nicholls (footballer) (1898–1970), Welsh international footballer
John Walter Nicholls (1909–1970), British ambassador
Jack "Putty Nose" Nicholls (1912–1981), Australian waterfront identity
John Nicholls (RAF officer) (1926–2007), British air marshal
John Graham Nicholls (born 1929), British/Swiss physiologist
Johnny Nicholls (1931–1995), English footballer
John Nicholls (footballer) (born 1939), Australian footballer
Jack Nicholls (born 1943), British Anglican Bishop of Sheffield
John Nicholls, British Committee of 100 signatory

See also
John Nickolls (1710–1745), English merchant
John Nichols (disambiguation)
John Nicholl (disambiguation)